Trinidad is a town and municipality in the Department of Casanare, Colombia.

In pre-Columbian times, the region was inhabited by the Achaguas, Guahibos and Chiricoas Indians, who were warrior and polygamous nomads, mainly engaged in deer hunting. Between 1720 and 1736, the Jesuit missionary Juan Rivero toured the region evangelizing the natives. On 12 February 1724 the town of Trinidad was founded by a group of indigenous Chiricoas, led by cacique Chacuamare, on the banks of the Meta River, on Rivero's recommendation. Subsequently, the town moved to the banks of the Pauto River. From Trinidad, the legendary llanero, true hero of the Vargas Swamp, is known from Trinidad, who contributed under his ideas to defeat the royalists in Boyacá.

External links
 Trinidad official website

References

Municipalities of Casanare Department
Populated places established in 1724